Emrah Kuş (born 13 October 1988 in Çorum, Turkey) is a Turkish Greco-Roman wrestler. Competing for İzmir Büyükşehir Belediyespor, he is coached by Cengiz Papağan and Kemal Karadağ.

At the 17th Mediterranean Games held in Mersin, Turkey in 2013, he became gold medalist.
He won the bronze medal in the 74 kg division at the 2013 World Wrestling Championships.

In 2022, he won one of the bronze medals in the men's Greco-Roman 82 kg event at the 2021 Islamic Solidarity Games held in Konya, Turkey.

References

External links
 

1988 births
Living people
Turkish male sport wrestlers
People from Çorum
European Games competitors for Turkey
Wrestlers at the 2015 European Games
World Wrestling Championships medalists
Mediterranean Games gold medalists for Turkey
Competitors at the 2013 Mediterranean Games
Mediterranean Games medalists in wrestling
European Wrestling Championships medalists
21st-century Turkish people